Rio Branco Futebol Clube, known as Rio Branco, Rio Branco-VN or Rio Branco de Venda Nova, is a Brazilian football team based in Venda Nova do Imigrante, in the state of Espírito Santo. Founded in 1945, the club plays in the Campeonato Capixaba and in the Campeonato Brasileiro Série D, holding home matches at the Estádio Olímpio Perim, with a capacity of 2,100 people.

Rio Branco-VN is currently ranked third among Espírito Santo teams in CBF's national club ranking at 131st place overall. They are the best placed team in the state from outside of Vitória.

History
Founded on 29 June 1945 by a group of friends, Rio Branco only started to play professionally in 1993, winning the second division of the Campeonato Capixaba. In 1995, in their second season in the first division, the club reached the finals but lost to Linhares.

In 1999, after suffering relegation, Rio Branco ceased first team activities, but kept their youth categories; the main squad only returned to the competitions in 2016, in the second division. In 2017, the club returned to the first division after 19 years, after finishing second in the second level.

In their return to the first division, Rio Branco was knocked out in the semifinals in 2018 and in the quarterfinals in 2019, before lifting the trophy for the first time in 2020. They also qualified for the 2021 Campeonato Brasileiro Série D, 2021 Copa Verde and the 2021 Copa do Brasil.

Honours
Campeonato Capixaba: 2020
Campeonato Capixaba Segunda Divisão: 1993

References

External links
Futebol Capixaba team profile 
Soccerway team profile

1945 establishments in Brazil
Association football clubs established in 1945
Football clubs in Espírito Santo